The  Military Bishopric of Peru  is a Latin Church military ordinariate of the Catholic Church. Immediately exempt to the Holy See, it provides pastoral care to Catholics serving in the Peruvian Armed Forces and their families.

Pope Francis appointed the Bishop Prelate of the Territorial Prelature of Caravelí, Bishop Juan Carlos Vera Plasencia, MSC, as bishop-designate for the Military Ordinariate of Peru on Wednesday, July 16, 2014. The bishop was be installed as military ordinary at a later date.

History
It was established as a military vicariate on 15 May 1943, but the  first military vicar was not appointed until 13 January 1945. It was elevated to a military ordinariate on 21 July 1986.

Office holders

Military vicars
 Juan Gualberto Guevara (appointed 13 January 1945 – died 27 November 1954)
 Carlos Maria Jurgens Byrne, C.SS.R. (appointed 7 February 1954 – translated to the Archdiocese of Cuzco 17 December 1956)
 Felipe Santiago Hermosa y Sarmiento, Archbishop (personal title) (appointed 17 December 1956 – retired 1967)
 Alcides Mendoza Castro, Archbishop (personal title) (appointed 12 August 1967 – translated to the Archdiocese of Cuzco 5 October 1983)
 Eduardo Picher Peña (appointed 14 June 1984 – became military ordinary 21 July 1986); see below

Military ordinaries
 Eduardo Picher Peña (appointed 21 July 1986 – retired 6 February 1996); see above
 Héctor Miguel Cabrejos Vidarte, O.F.M. (appointed 6 February 1996 – translated to the Archdiocese of Trujillo 29 July 1999)
 Salvador Piñeiro García-Calderón (appointed 21 July 2001 – translated to the Archdiocese of Ayacucho 6 August 2011)
 Guillermo Martín Abanto Guzmán (appointed 30 October 2012 – retired July 20, 2013)
 Juan Carlos Vera Plasencia (appointed 16 July 2014 – ); formerly, Bishop Prelate of the Territorial Prelature of Caravelí

References

 Military Ordinariate of Peru (Catholic-Hierarchy)
 Obispado Castrense del Perú (GCatholic.org)
  (Vatican Website)

Peru
Peru